Leeds United F.C. first played European football with their appearance in the 1965–66 Inter-Cities Fairs Cup, a competition which they have won twice. Their first European Cup/Champions League appearance came in 1969–70. Leeds' first and last appearance in the Cup Winners' Cup came in 1972–73.

Summary 
The club's debut in European competitions came in the 1965–66 season in the Inter-Cities Fairs Cup, which they competed in for three consecutive seasons before winning the trophy in the 1967–68 season. They had been on the losing side in the same competition a year previously, and won it again in 1970–71, the final season of its existence before it was effectively replaced by the new UEFA Cup.

The club reached a further two European finals during the 1970s; the European Cup Winners' Cup final in 1973 and the European Cup final in 1975. However, they were beaten on both occasions. Their venture into the 1979–80 UEFA Cup would be their last in European competitions for more than a decade; it ended in the second round.

European competitions then became effectively out of the question for Leeds, who were relegated to the Second Division in 1982 and did not win promotion until 1990. League title glory in 1992 sealed their return to Europe after more than a decade as England's representatives in the European Cup, where they were eliminated in the second round by Scottish champions Rangers.

In 1999–2000, the club enjoyed its best run in European competitions for 25 years, reaching the semi-finals of the UEFA Cup. They reached the semi-finals of the Champions League in the 2000–2001 season losing to  Valencia (changes in qualification requirements meant that they could now qualify as the third placed team in their domestic league) a year later. Their most recent European campaign to date was in the 2002–03 season, where they competed in the UEFA Cup and reached the third round. By this stage, however, the club was deep in financial trouble and was starting to sell most of its key players, which contributed to relegation from the Premier League at the end of the 2003–04. Sixteen years on, the club has regained its place in the top flight of English football.

Matches

Notes and references

Europe
English football clubs in international competitions